Hongouyeh or Hngouyeh or Hongouyeh or Hangooyeh may refer to:
 Henguiyeh, Hormozgan
 Henguiyeh, Baft, Kerman Province
 Henguiyeh, Sirjan, Kerman Province
 Henguiyeh, Zarand, Kerman Province